Alkmaar is a municipality and a city in the Netherlands.

Alkmaar may also refer to:

 Alkmaar, Mpumalanga, a hamlet in South Africa
 Alkmaar, Suriname, a resort in Suriname
 HNLMS Alkmaar, two ships of the Netherlands navy

See also
 Battle of Alkmaar (disambiguation)